The 2010 Gomelsky Cup is a European basketball competition that occurred between October 1 and October 3.

Participants
  CSKA Moscow - host
  Partizan Belgrade - Euroleague semifinalist
  Panathinaikos Athens
  Žalgiris Kaunas

Results 

2009
2010–11 in Russian basketball
2010–11 in Lithuanian basketball
2010–11 in Greek basketball
2010–11 in Serbian basketball